Dizəvər (also Dizavar) is a village in the Khizi Rayon of Azerbaijan.  The village forms part of the municipality of Qarabulaq.

References 

Populated places in Khizi District